Rodna Zashtita, meaning Native Defense, was a nationalist, anti-Semitic, fascist organization that operated in Bulgaria from before 1923 to 1936. At its peak in the late 1920s, it had tens of thousands of members.

Rodna Zashtita had an anti-agrarian, anti-communist, and anti-Semitic ideology. In addition, the organization opposed the Freemasons. The organization advocated corporatism and demanded the abolition of political parties. The members of the organization wore black shirts, saluted with a fascist salute and spread propaganda of love for Bulgaria and preaching sacrifice for the homeland. The organization has been classified as "proto-fascist" by the researcher of fascism in Bulgaria, Nikolai Poppetrov. Rodna Zashtita sporadically committed attacks upon Bulgarian Turks. In 1933, the group attacked the Turkish cemetery in Razgrad. After 1936, its members merged with the Ratnik organization.

See also
Fascism in Bulgaria

References

Far-right politics
Nationalist organizations
Political organizations based in Bulgaria
Fascist organizations
Ratniks